Krzesin Landscape Park is a protected area (Landscape Park) located in western Poland which was established in 1998 and covers an area of .

The park lies within Lubusz Voivodeship: in Krosno Odrzańskie County (Gmina Gubin, Gmina Maszewo) and Słubice County (Gmina Cybinka). It takes its name from the village of Krzesin in Gmina Cybinka.

References 

Krzesin
Parks in Lubusz Voivodeship